MuggleNet is the Internet's oldest and largest Harry Potter and Wizarding World fansite. Founded in 1999, MuggleNet distinguished itself early on by its unique and comprehensive content. Barely one year after it was launched, the site was seeing hundreds of thousands of daily visitors each month at its peak. It has expanded over the years to include a handful of partner podcasts, a separate book blog, over half a dozen published works and live events. At one point, it also ran its own forums, social network and separate fan fiction website. MuggleNet currently features over 200 pages of content plus an archive of over 18,000 articles, including news, editorials, recipes, a caption contest and more. Originally owned by founder Emerson Spartz, MuggleNet became an independently-owned and operated brand in early 2020 and, according to its Twitter bio, has been women-led since 2017.

Relationship with the franchise
MuggleNet once benefitted from friendly relations with J. K. Rowling, the author of the Harry Potter books, and the producers of the films. She has praised MuggleNet on her website and awarded it her Fan Site Award. Rowling has also recounted on her website that she visited the site and sometimes read comments left by visitors, although she never commented herself. The author also stated that she visited the site's chat room and was snubbed when she anonymously joined a conversation about Harry Potter theories.

In July 2005, Rowling invited Spartz and Melissa Anelli, of the Leaky Cauldron, to Edinburgh, Scotland, for an interview at her home on the release of Harry Potter and the Half-Blood Prince. J. K. Rowling mentioned MuggleNet through the interactive Harry Potter website Pottermore in September 2013, saying how proud she was to own the key to La Porte, Indiana, hometown of MuggleNet founder Emerson Spartz.

Warner Bros., the producers of the Harry Potter movies, regularly sent MuggleNet stills taken from the upcoming movies before they were released. The studio also provided MuggleNet staff with advance views of the new official website designs, as well as included staff in a video conference to discuss the Harry Potter theme park at Universal Orlando Resort. Universal has extended invitations to MuggleNet to attend the opening of the Wizarding World of Harry Potter at Universal Studios Hollywood in addition to the opening of Diagon Alley and Hagrid’s Magical Creatures Motorbike Adventure at Universal Orlando Resort.

In July 2020, MuggleNet, together with the Leaky Cauldron, took several steps to distance themselves from Rowling due to comments she made the previous month that they perceived as transphobic. In a joint statement, the sites wrote that her views were "out of step with the message of acceptance and empowerment we find in her books and celebrated by the Harry Potter community". They announced that they would no longer use photos of the author, link to her website, or write about achievements unrelated to the Potterverse. Although in January 2021, MuggleNet promised to no longer provide news coverage of J. K. Rowling's works set outside of the wizarding world, they kept publishing articles related to J. K.  Rowling's books as Robert Galbraith.

Features

MuggleNet Interactive

MuggleNet Interactive (often shortened to MNI) was a website spin-off of MuggleNet. It was an online forum where users could interact with each other in a Hogwarts-style setting. In addition to the general chat areas, the site was known for its diverse offerings, including the roleplaying area, the blog-style Chamber of Secrets, the high-speed trivia games of the Quidditch pitch, and the professor-led classes taught in a Socratic method. Semiannual House Cup competitions encouraged House unity and often allowed members to compete for honors in contests with essays, graphics, or other media. The MNI community also celebrated many holidays, as well as the shared birthday of Harry Potter and J. K. Rowling, with a "ball" in the otherwise closed Great Hall. Many site secrets were hidden throughout MNI's pages and were often sought for their Galleon rewards, but speaking of them on the site itself was forbidden. The many distinct components of the site contributed to the diverse community that it attracted.

The site was originally formed from a personality quiz made in 2000, which was later adapted for the fuller version of the site as a Sorting Hat. Over the years, sections such as a Diagon Alley shopping area, a dueling game, Flourish and Blotts fan fiction library, quizzes, Quidditch, and other subsections outside of the forum structure were incorporated into the site. The staff hierarchy was originally modeled after the faculty structure at Hogwarts with a Headmaster/Headmistress as the main site administrator overseeing moderating prefects and class-leading professors, but over time, non-canon positions, such as programmers, artists and quiz masters, were added in addition to other Harry Potter-themed appointments.

Due to lack of server space and low traffic volumes, the site was shut down on August 1, 2016, after 13 years of operation.

MuggleNet Fan Fiction

On November 14, 2004, MuggleNet opened its fan fiction subsite, MuggleNet Fan Fiction (often shortened to MNFF), following in the footsteps of other Potter-specific fan fiction sites.

In 2006, the site began its annual Quick Silver Quill Awards, in which authors and readers could nominate their favorite fictions from various categories to receive recognition.

Its forums house discussion groups aimed at improving reading and writing skills, as well as community building within the membership of the site. Popular areas include the Susan Bones Book Club (SBBC), where members are encouraged to share and discuss their favorite fictions from the site; Society for the Promotion of Evaluations for Writers (SPEW), where members can improve their critical review writing skills; the Three Broomsticks (TTB), where members can partake in writing challenges; and the Bannermakers Association and Dean's Corner, where members can stretch their artistic muscles and create banners and fan art that complement the site's fictions.

MuggleNet Fan Fiction also hosts its own version of Hogwarts within its forums, offering classes to new authors who wish to learn more about writing. These are run by members of the site who volunteer to teach a subject that interests them. The classes are very popular, with more authors taking part each term (run in trimesters). The classes are run in levels: first years, OWLs, and NEWTs, getting progressively more in-depth and allowing authors to choose at which level they wish to participate.

MuggleSpace
Launched during the Christmas holidays of 2008, MuggleSpace was a fan-based social network designed to provide a live online community for Harry Potter fans all over the world. The site contained a number of features, including a live group and private chat (monitored and participated in frequently by site moderators); blogs where users could share their personal creations and comment on the works of others such as novels, poems, fan fiction, or their own thoughts on the Potter world; and groups where users actively role-played or showed support for their favorite fandoms, causes, or fellow members. Other features included photos, videos, and discussion forums. For many, the site was a sanctuary for discussing problems and connecting with like-minded people. Unfortunately, the site was forced to close its doors in November 2013 due to lack of participation.

MuggleNet Book Trolley
The MuggleNet Book Trolley, one of MuggleNet's oldest-running features, was originally started by resident reviewer Robbie Fish, who published more than 1,000 reviews over 13 years. In 2013, the MuggleNet Book Trolley was revamped as a subdomain of MuggleNet.com. Fish teamed up with bloggers Charlie Morris and Lauren Rice to bring book lovers a new format. As its own separate site, the MuggleNet Book Trolley features book reviews written by MuggleNet staff members, exclusive interviews with authors, book giveaways, and more.

The blog posts multiple reviews each month, giving staff members the chance to share their thoughts and love of books from different genres and backgrounds. Books reviewed on the MuggleNet Book Trolley range from science-fiction and fantasy books similar to the Harry Potter series to more nonfiction selections, including biographies and recipe books.

Special projects

25 Days of Giveaways
Formerly known as the MuggleNet Advent Calendar giveaway, 25 Days of Giveaways is hosted annually between December 1 and December 25. Fans from around the world have the opportunity to win 25 different giveaways and special prizes, as well as a grand prize, all supplied by MuggleNet partners.

From 2011 to 2016, the Advent Calendar giveaway sent participants on a scavenger hunt around MuggleNet.com to locate the page for each day's trivia question, which they needed to answer correctly in order to be entered into the draw. In 2017, the event was renamed to 25 Days of Giveaways and moved primarily to MuggleNet’s social media channels, with bonus entries awarded for "MuggleNet Favorites" in addition to correctly answering a trivia question.

Trivia questions range from the specifics of wands and magical creatures to information from the books and the movies and about the wizarding world in general. Prizes include merchandise such as T-shirts, wands, tumblers, autographed memorabilia, books, and collectible items from the franchise.

April Fools' Day
Every April Fools' Day, MuggleNet creates prank posts for readers. The tradition began in 2008 with a series of articles highlighting "the most interesting tidbits" of the long-rumored Harry Potter encyclopedia, covering everything from Veela sex scandals to steroid use in Quidditch, with visitors being led to believe that they were reading about exclusive content from J. K. Rowling herself. Over the years, MuggleNet has teased closing its doors, faked casting announcements, book titles, release dates, and film updates, and even rickrolled its visitors under the guise of new Harry Potter content.

Wizolympics
The Wizolympics are a series of fictional athletic games and events that take place alongside the actual Olympic Games. Beginning with the 2014 Winter Olympics, which took place in Sochi, Russia, MuggleNet has published a series of articles reporting on the Wizolympics from the point of view of several (mostly fictional) journalists from the Daily Prophet. Some of the articles include stories that feature established characters from the books such as Ludo Bagman and Rita Skeeter. Many of the events described in the Wizolympics are specific to members of the wizarding community, such as dragon wrangling, doxy baiting, and body-bind surfing, whereas some events are derived from the real Olympic Games but given a wizarding spin, such as fencing (in which competitors build fences) and bobsledding (in which only people named Bob qualify). Though the 2020 Summer Olympics in Tokyo, Japan, were postponed by one year due to the COVID-19 pandemic, MuggleNet forged ahead with the 2020 Summer Wizolympics, as well as the 2016 Summer Wizolympics.

Podcasts

Current podcasts

Accio Politics
Accio Politics launched on July 31, 2017, as an independent podcast dedicated to the chapter-by-chapter analysis of politics in the wizarding world. From government to patriarchy to friendship to legacy, host Adriana Wilson and her weekly guest cover a myriad of topics, seeking to deconstruct the political implications behind the characters and story. On March 3, 2019, Accio Politics joined forces with MuggleNet. The podcast is produced and as of May 2020, cohosted by MuggleNet staff member Helene Karp.

Alohomora!
Founded in April 2012 by Noah Fried and Kat Miller, Alohomora! aims to rekindle the excitement of when the Harry Potter series was new, fresh, and unknown. Its slogan, "Open the Dumbledore", refers to the nature of the podcast, which is to open doors and thoughts that had previously been locked or untouched. It focuses on the original text of the books and takes segments or passages and analyzes them to a depth that has never been done before.

At first, the initiative included forums, visitor essays ("Quibbles"), and thousands of daily debates as well as a podcast. The hosts are joined by a fan guest on almost every episode – occasionally a leading fandom guest such as Lev Grossman, Steve Vander Ark, or Warwick Davis. The podcast itself includes in-depth analysis of chapters from the Harry Potter series, often paired with analysis of material from other sources such as the Harry Potter Lexicon or Wizarding World Digital (formerly known as Pottermore), a reading and discussion of listener comments, and various special features created by the hosts.

Upon finishing each book in the series during the first read-through, the podcast hosts would celebrate with a live show and global viewing of the corresponding Warner Bros. film adaptation. The show now releases biweekly episodes alternating between topics suggested by listeners and revisits of specific chapters from the Potter books in no particular order.

The current roster of lead hosts includes Grace Candido-Beecher, Katy Cartee Haile, Tracy Dunstan, Rex Hadden, Irvin Khaytman, Aurelia Lieb, Kat Miller, Alison Siggard, and Sam Williams. Due to hiatuses taken by both PotterCast (launched in 2005) and Hogwarts Radio (launched in 2008), Alohomora! is the second-longest-running continuously released Harry Potter podcast (after its first podcast, MuggleCast).

Alohomora!: Full Circle
Alohomora!: Full Circle is a reread of the Harry Potter series through the lens of ring composition. It premiered on November 1, 2020, and is hosted by Alohomora! cocreator Kat Miller and a special guest that changes for each book. The show started as an exclusive for Patreon supporters of Alohomora!, but is now available to the general public across all major platforms.

Dialogue Alley
Dialogue Alley launched in January 2021 and joined MuggleNet in the fall of 2022. The hosts Carly Jay, Erik Krueger, and Melanie Friedman talk about Harry Potter translations, artwork, and editions from around the world. Each episode features a segment aptly titled The Translation of the Show, where the hosts dive deeper into a particular book from another country. Dialogue Alley focuses primarily on Harry Potter books from around the world, but will discuss all other things magical as well. New episodes are released weekly.

MuggleCast

MuggleCast launched in August 2005 when podcasts were still up and coming. Inspired by the passion within the Harry Potter community, MuggleNet staff members Andrew Sims, Ben Schoen, and Kevin Steck created a short podcast to discuss some of the recent Harry Potter news and the just-released Harry Potter and the Half-Blood Prince. The reception from MuggleNet's audience was great, so the team expanded the shows with a wealth of new cohosts and content.

MuggleCast recorded what it announced would be its final regular episode on August 26, 2013. However, on December 27, 2014, it was announced that they would be returning to regular episodes. MuggleCast began posting weekly podcasts again in April 2017. It is currently hosted by Andrew Sims, Eric Scull, Micah Tannenbaum, and Laura Tee and is enjoyed by over 50,000 listeners a week.

The show has interviewed many big names in Harry Potter, including David Heyman, David Yates, Oliver Phelps, Evanna Lynch, Warwick Davis, Arthur Bowen, Will Dunn, Patrick Doyle, Mary GrandPré, Jim Dale, and Arthur Parsons (LEGO Harry Potter).

In September 2019, MuggleCast was featured in an article in The Oprah Magazine: "26 of the Best Book Podcasts to Listen to When You're Not Reading".

Following Sims's departure from the site in summer 2011, MuggleCast separated from MuggleNet to become an independent podcast. The hosts now discuss the Fantastic Beasts films, the Wizarding World of Harry Potter theme parks, and fandom news, along with continued in-depth discussion of the original Harry Potter series.

Potterversity
Potterversity is an academic Harry Potter podcast dedicated to exploring the series and wider wizarding world from a critical perspective across a variety of fields. It is hosted by Katy McDaniel, a history professor at Marietta College in Marietta, Ohio, and Emily Strand, an instructor of comparative religions at Mount Carmel College of Nursing in Columbus, Ohio. Each episode focuses on a different topic or approach and features guests who are researchers, teachers, scholars, or writers.

First launched on August 14, 2017, as Reading, Writing, Rowling and originally hosted by McDaniel and John Granger, the podcast was rebranded on October 31, 2020. Part of this rebranding included a move away from discussion of J.K. Rowling's works set outside of the wizarding world and a conscious decision to focus only on the Harry Potter series and related media.

SpeakBeasty
On December 20, 2015, MuggleNet premiered SpeakBeasty, a podcast entirely dedicated to the Fantastic Beasts film series. In discussing this new era in the Wizarding World, SpeakBeasty brings back the theorizing and speculation that has been such a pivotal part of the fandom since the early days of Harry Potter.

The show has seen many special guests over the years, including Dan Fogler (Jacob Kowalski), Chris Rankin (Percy Weasley), Poppy Corby-Tuech (Vinda Rosier), William Nadylam (Yusuf Kama), James Payton (Frank Longbottom), and Peyton Kennedy (Grey’s Anatomy, Everything Sucks). In 2016, SpeakBeasty hosted a live show at New York Comic Con and attended the premiere of Fantastic Beasts and Where to Find Them in New York City on November 10.

The current roster of hosts includes Rex Hadden, Amy Hogan, Geoffrey Hutton, Helene Karp, Ann Lysy, Marjolaine Martin, Shannen Michaelson, and Lizzie Pouliot.

Former podcasts

Beyond the Veil
Premiering March 8, 2019, Beyond the Veil, hosted by former MuggleNet staff members Madison Ford and Rebecca Sherman, discussed the deeper impacts the Harry Potter series has had on fans. Focusing on themes such as overcoming obstacles, creating positive change, and mental health crises allowed for a safe space to explore and share trials, tribulations, and triumphs.

Madison and Rebecca have also been joined by several guests who have shared their own personal journeys, including how Harry Potter and the wizarding world were there for them. Guests have included some of MuggleNet's own contributors and staff as well as clinical psychologist Janina Scarlet, host of Harry Potter Therapy.

Its last episode was released on June 21, 2021.

MuggleNet Academia
MuggleNet Academia was a podcast hosted and produced by former MuggleNet managing editor Keith Hawk and the Hogwarts Professor, John Granger, revolving around a particular aspect of literature found within the Harry Potter book series.

The idea for the show was presented to the staff of MuggleNet by cohost John Granger to revive the "Potter Pundit" section that was originally held on several episodes of PotterCast, the Leaky Cauldron website's podcast. However, MuggleNet Academia created an entire show dedicated to one theoretical discussion topic as opposed to just a segment.

Each show featured a special guest speaker, usually a professor or other academic specialist, as well as a student guest, usually an undergraduate, graduate student, or recent graduate who excels in the field of each particular lesson.

The first episode was released in April 2012, and the show quickly climbed to be the second-highest educational podcast on iTunes. An iOS and Amazon mobile app were also available, providing access to all of the normal episodes as well as periodic bonus material, typically in the format of an interview of a college or university professor who teaches a particular Harry Potter-themed course at their school.

In January 2017, MuggleNet Academia was discontinued following Hawk's departure from the site. Its last episode was released on December 12, 2016.

MuggleNet Fan Fiction's AudioFictions
MuggleNet Fan Fiction's AudioFictions ran for nearly six years with a total of 200 episodes (January 3, 2009-December 28, 2014). It was founded by MuggleNet Fan Fiction (MNFF) staff member Rosie Morris (known by her MNFF username, Roxy Black). The podcast's goal was to bring Harry Potter fan fiction to fans around the globe in a new way, with recorded readings by the AudioFictions readers, known as “MerMuggles” (a portmanteau of "Merpeople" and "Muggle", in reference to the podcast's operations being centered in the  MuggleNet Fan Fiction Beta Board's Black Lake thread). The original team, led by Morris, consisted of Clare Mansfield, Equinox Chick, Jessie Lights, kiley, MuggleNet staff member Michael Harle (known by his MNFF username, Lupinpatronus), Nixemus (who composed the show's original music), Schmerg_the_Impaler, Weasleykitty, and Nixemus. Other MerMuggles who joined the show later include coolh5000, Eratosthenese, Faerie Dust, Finest Firewhisky, sajomn, and type-n-shadow.

The podcast strove to ensure that, as its slogan states, "the magic lives beyond the books". The show's readers brought to life the stories written by Harry Potter fans and posted to  MuggleNet Fan Fiction, with original, character-based interstitials to interlock the fictions. The show invited listeners to participate in creating its content by nominating fictions and participating in contests.

AudioFictions experienced a low-key revision in early 2010, with Nixemus stepping into the role of project manager. Nixemus also created and filled the new host role and brought the show closer to its most recent format. In late 2010, Harle was promoted to project manager and host, adding new MerMuggle readers Apollonious, Chadadada17, and theGreatOm to the lineup. Harle also created the editor role for AudioFictions, bringing Granger7, pinkdude64, and stevenrankin onto the team. Under Harle's direction, and following a lengthy absence and revision, AudioFictions was quietly relaunched in 2011 with a new format and release schedule. This format was, again, modified before the show's major relaunch in 2012.

Published works
In 2006, in advance of the arrival of Harry Potter and the Deathly Hallows, five MuggleNet staff members (Andy Gordon, Jamie Lawrence, Ben Schoen, Emerson Spartz, and Gretchen Stull) coauthored the reference book What Will Happen in Harry Potter 7: Who Lives, Who Dies, Who Falls in Love, and How Will the Adventure Finally End, which was a published collection of unofficial fan predictions. By July 21, 2007, the book had sold 335,000 copies and reached #2 on the New York Times Children's Best Seller list, where it spent six months. Spartz and his coauthors launched a marketing campaign in June 2007 to promote their work. This included a tour of the United States where they stopped at many bookstores and discussed their various theories and revelations.

In 2009, Emerson Spartz and Ben Schoen penned another book, MuggleNet.com's Harry Potter Should Have Died: Controversial Views from the #1 Fan Site. A cross-country book tour took place in the summer of 2009.

In March 2009, MuggleNet Fan Fiction released a self-help guide to creative writing entitled Sharpen Your Quill. The book offers advice on writing plot, characterization, poetry, specific genres, and other useful information, including grammar and fluent style. As a self-published book, the release made little revenue, but the proceeds were used to fund AudioFictions, the site's former audiobook-style podcast.

In November 2010, Mugglenet Fan Fiction authors published Through the Keyhole, a collection of short stories and poems. The stories vary in style and content, offering a little something for everyone, and were written to raise money for the charity Room to Read, with all proceeds going to aid the education of children around the world.

In June 2020, MuggleNet published The Unofficial Harry Potter Character Compendium: MuggleNet's Ultimate Guide to Who's Who in the Wizarding World. Written by five MuggleNet staff members (Sophia Jenkins, Chelsea Korynta, Catherine Lai, Marissa Osman, and Richa Venkatraman), the book features over 700 characters and includes details of when the character was first mentioned, their appearance, the wizarding school they attended, their House, their Patronus, their wand, related family members, their skills and achievements, their personal history, and more. The follows the first book in the series, The Unofficial Ultimate Harry Potter Spellbook: A Complete Reference Guide to Every Spell in the Wizarding World.

In November 2020, MuggleNet celebrated the publication of Dumbledore: The Life and Lies of Hogwarts's Renowned Headmaster, the third edition of Irvin Khaytman's book The Life and Lies of Albus Percival Wulfric Brian Dumbledore. This recently updated adaptation dives between the lines of the Harry Potter books to create a portrait of the controversial headmaster, offering a glimpse into Dumbledore's hand in every seeming coincidence and the difficult choices he had to make.

MuggleNet Live!

MuggleNet Live! 2015: Expo Patronum
On October 31, 2014, the site announced MuggleNet Live! 2015: Expo Patronum. It was described as  The convention was held on April 18, 2015, in London, England, and featured several special guests from the films, including Afshan Azad (Padma Patil), Jon Campling (unnamed Death Eater), Jessie Cave (Lavender Brown), Warwick Davis (Professor Filius Flitwick & Griphook), Alfred Enoch (Dean Thomas),  Rohan Gotobed (young Sirius Black), wand combat choreographer Paul Harris, Robbie Jarvis (teenage James Potter), Georgina Leonidas (Katie Bell), Harry Melling (Dudley Dursley), graphic design team MinaLima (Miraphora Mina and Eduardo Lima), Nick Moran (Scabior), Chris Rankin (Percy Weasley), Anna Shaffer (Romilda Vane), Nick Shirm (Zacharias Smith), Natalia Tena (Nymphadora Tonks), and art director  Gary Tomkins.

MuggleNet Live! 2017: Nineteen Years Later
On September 1, 2017, MuggleNet hosted MuggleNet Live! 2017: Nineteen Years Later at the Wizarding World of Harry Potter at Universal Studios Florida to celebrate the date on which Harry Potter would have sent his son Albus Severus to Hogwarts for the first time, according to the epilogue of Harry Potter and the Deathly Hallows. The event began with panels of actors from the Potter films. Special guests included Chris Rankin (Percy Weasley), Christian Coulson (Tom Marvolo Riddle), Luke Youngblood (Lee Jordan), Sean Biggerstaff (Oliver Wood), Ellie Darcey-Alden (young Lily Evans), Rohan Gotobed (young Sirius Black), and Ryan Turner (Hugo Weasley).

After the panels, attendees were invited to walk the streets of the Diagon Alley section of the theme park after hours. Guests could ride Harry Potter and the Escape from Gringotts and the Hogwarts Express, eat at the Leaky Cauldron, and freely interact with the actors the throughout the evening. Attendees also enjoyed the Olivanders wand experience and watched performances of Celestina Warbeck and the Banshees and the Tales of Beedle the Bard.

The event was sponsored by Funko, Tervis Tumbler, Candlewick Press, Hogwarts Running Club, and Insight Editions.

MuggleNet Live! 2019: Into the Pensieve
On October 4 and 5, MuggleNet hosted MuggleNet Live! 2019: Into the Pensieve at New York Comic Con 2019.

Friday evening's variety show panel, MuggleNet: Harry Potter Journeys into the Pensieve, was emceed by Eric Scull, a longtime MuggleNet staff member. The event included a brief history of MuggleNet, an on-the-spot Crazy Caption Contest, a re-creation of a book-only scene, a Mad Libs morality tale, staff member improvs, and more. The whole audience participated in the singing of the Hogwarts school song and later a synchronized rendition of Potter Puppet Pals''' "The Mysterious Ticking Noise".

Special guests included Fantastic Beasts series actor Dan Fogler (Jacob Kowalski), who jumped in on the Erumpent dance contest, and Off-Broadway Puffs performer Andy Miller (Leanne), who joined contestants in charades. Video messages from Harry Potter actors Warwick Davis (Professor Filius Flitwick/Griphook) and Evanna Lynch (Luna Lovegood) and Wizarding World of Harry Potter art director Alan Gilmore were played.

On Saturday, MuggleNet hosted an in-person component of its MuggleNet 20th Anniversary Virtual 20K run. Whether you could make it in person or not, everyone who registered received a personalized digital running bib and a 3" platinum running medal featuring a spinning Time-Turner. This event was in partnership with Potterhead Running Club. Participants were asked to come dressed in their best cosplay or magical Muggle clothes. A bonus 20-year charm was given to those who showed up for the event in person.

Saturday evening, MuggleNet hosted a dance party at the Hard Rock Cafe in Times Square. Entertainment and excitement included Harry Potter-themed drinks, amazing cosplay, and classic songs from 1999 to 2019.

Activism

MuggleNet has collaborated with several organizations over the years to raise awareness as well as funds to support causes and social justice. In 2010, MuggleNet, along with several groups in the Harry Potter fandom, created a four-hour event called Helping Haiti Heal, with all proceeds going to Partners in Health to help provide health care to areas without reliable medical care following the disastrous earthquake that hit the country that year. In 2016, MuggleNet and Hogwarts Running Club (now Potterhead Running Club) created the Fantastic Beasts 5K, a charity race that benefited END7 (supported by Fantastic Beasts actor Eddie Redmayne and former Harry Potter actor Tom Felton). In July 2018, MuggleNet ran a campaign in honor of J.K. Rowling and Harry Potter's shared birthday called Thank You for the Magic. This campaign helped benefit four smaller charity organizations associated with the Harry Potter fandom: the Harry Potter Alliance, Project Purple (pancreatic cancer research), the Protego Foundation (animal rights), and the Trevor Project.

In August 2019, MuggleNet ran a campaign called Magical Books for Muggle Teachers. The goal of this campaign was to help teachers, who often have to use their own money for supplies, by providing classrooms in the United States with copies of Harry Potter and the Sorcerer's Stone. In October 2019, MuggleNet and Potterhead Running Club sponsored a virtual 20K, with all proceeds going to Potterhead Running Club, whose mission is to motivate fans to be more physically active while supporting other direct-impact charities.

In June 2020, MuggleNet volunteers made a collective donation to Black Trans Advocacy Coalition and the NAACP Legal Defense and Educational Fund to help fight policy brutality and all racially motivated violence against people of color. The following month, MuggleNet and several other groups, podcasts, and entities in the Harry Potter fandom held a fundraiser supporting Lambda Legal, the Marsha P. Johnson Institute (defending human rights of black transgender people), and the Trans Justice Funding Project (funding for groups run by and for trans people) through the sale of merchandise featuring the iconic lightning bolt with transgender pride flag colors. Within 9 hours, the fundraiser reached its initial goal of $5,000.

In July 2021, MuggleNet cohosted SKREWTs (Showdown of Knowledgeable Rivals Engaging in Wizarding Trivia), a live trivia contest in partnership with the YouTube channel SuperCarlinBrothers, in benefit of the It Gets Better Project. The event raised $11,000 in just two hours. In December of that same year, MuggleNet hosted a charity event called Fandom Games for Good to raise money for the Transgender Law Center. The site partnered with friends from across the Harry Potter fandom and franchise to play a series of virtual Wizarding World-themed games inspired by iconic game shows like Jeopardy!, Family Feud, Password and Match Game. Fandom Games for Good ultimately raised $2,000.

In popular culture
In October 2007, Jimmy Kimmel Live! did a parody of Emerson Spartz's recent interview on the "Geraldo" segment of Fox News. Both the original interview and the parody discussed J. K. Rowling's recent outing of Headmaster of Hogwarts Albus Dumbledore.

MuggleNet was featured on an episode of UK game show The Chase on January 14, 2014. The question asked was "MuggleNet.com is a website dedicated to what fictional character?" The contestant chose to pass rather than answer the question.

In February 2014, fact-checking website Snopes published an article debunking the rumor that actress Emma Watson would be playing Ariel in a live-action version of Walt Disney Pictures' The Little Mermaid. The source of this rumor was a 2013 April Fools' Day article published by MuggleNet.

MuggleNet was featured in the Los Angeles Times crossword puzzle on March 12, 2015. The clue for 9 down was "story you might find on MuggleNet.com, briefly", with the answer "fanfic".

MuggleNet was featured in the New York Times crossword puzzle on May 1, 2019. The clue for 18 down was "MuggleNet or the Leaky Cauldron, for Harry Potter readers", with the answer "fansite". On August 6, 2020, MuggleNet was again featured in the New York Times'' crossword puzzle. This time, the clue for 14 down was "MuggleNet for Harry Potter devotees", with the answer again "fansite".

See also

 Harry Potter fandom

References

External links
 MuggleNet
 Alohomora!
 MuggleCast
 SpeakBeasty
 MuggleNet Book Trolley
 MuggleNet Fan Fiction
 MuggleNet Live!

Harry Potter websites
Companies based in Indiana
Internet properties established in 1999
1999 establishments in Indiana